Udara Palliyaguruge is a Sri Lankan film director in Sinhala cinema and the director of Super Six, which premiered on 17 May 2012. A Hindi version of Super Six also premiered simultaneously in Mumbai, India.

Early life and career 

He was born to a family of two as the youngest child.

Udara was involved in stage drama at Gurukula College, Kelaniya and acted in dramas such as Oedipus (Sinhalese translation), Ratnawali and No Kabuki plays (Sinhala translation). Later he was involved in the National Theatre as a stage manager, costume designer and actor in productions such as Bansi Marila Nehe, Ape Panthi Kamare and Queenie. After his schooling, Udara joined the National Film Institute in Pune, India, where he completed his Bachelor of Arts in Film Making.

Udara later worked at Sirasa TV and MTV in Sri Lanka, where he produced and directed TV programmes such as Hindi Top Ten, Lasama, Subasiri, Eye-to-Eye, and Style.

Career

Udara has produced 4 full-length films: Super Six (2012), 'Pani Makuluwo' (2017), 'Sama Kumaru Kathawa' (2019) and 'Soosthi' (yet to be released). He has also worked on two Teledramas as the producer: 'Thuthiri' (2018) and 'Crime Scenes' (2018). As managing director of Aristo Films, Udara has produced over 180 TV commercials (brands), 400 TV commercials (non-brands), 40 documentaries and profiles. He is currently working as CEO of Guththila Strategic Solutions (Pvt) Ltd.

Filmography

{| class="wikitable"
|-
! YEAR       !! TELEDRAMA                !! ROLE'''
|-
| 2018             || Thuthiri                      || Producer, Writer
|-
| 2018             || Crime Scene                   || Director, Writer
|}

International exposure
Udara participated in numerous international advertising and communications programmes and awards ceremonies over the years, including: 
AD Asia 2005 to 08  – Singapore
Broadcast Asia & Communic Asia 2005 – 2007 – Singapore
Team Tech TV and Radio conference 2004 – 2007  – India

Academic career
Visiting Lecturer – University of Kelaniya, Faculty of Marketing Management
Director – Sri Lanka Television Training Institute – http://www.slf.lk
First to conduct film workshop in Jaffna in Association with Tharunayata Hetak, organised by the Government of Sri Lanka

See alsoSuper SixPani MakuluwoSama Kumaru KathawaThuththiri (Teledrama) References 
Udara Palliyaguruge at the NFC
Udara Palliyaguruge at Films.lk

"'Super Six' scores Rs. 10.5 million in first week" at The Island"Sri Lankan Hot Film 'Super Six' Smashes Records on First Week" at Zimbio''

1981 births
Living people
Sri Lankan film directors